Maine is a U.S. state.

Maine may also refer to:

Places
Gulf of Maine, a gulf off the coast of the U.S. state
Province of Maine, 17th-century English colonial entities on territory that eventually became the U.S. state

France
Maine (province)
Maine-et-Loire
Maine (river)

United States
Maine Township, Cook County, Illinois
Maine Township, Grundy County, Illinois
Maine River (Maine)
Maine Township, Otter Tail County, Minnesota
Maine, New York, a town
Maine, Marathon County, Wisconsin, a village
Maine, Outagamie County, Wisconsin, a town

Names
Maine (given name)
Maine (surname)
Maines (surname)

Ships
SS Maine, a British steam ship
USS Maine (ACR-1), a second-class pre-dreadnought battleship, launched in 1889, whose sinking contributed to the outbreak of the Spanish–American War
Maine-class battleship, a battleship class of the U.S. Navy
USS Maine (BB-10), the lead ship of the Maine-class battleship, launched in 1901
USS Maine (BB-69), a Montana-class battleship cancelled in 1943
USS Maine (SSBN-741), an Ohio-class nuclear ballistic missile submarine launched in 1994
TS State of Maine, a training ship of the Maine Maritime Academy

Other uses
Maine (film), a 2018 American drama film
Maine (Red vs. Blue), a character in Red vs. Blue
The Maine (Des Moines, Iowa), U.S., a historic apartment building
The Maine (band), an American pop punk band
Maine Soft Drinks Ltd, a Northern Irish soft drink manufacturer
Uí Maine, an ancient Irish kingdom
University of Maine, a university in the U.S. state
State of Maine Express, a 20th-century night train from New York City to Portland, Maine
The Maine Oyster Bar & Grill, a Dubai-based brasserie

See also
Counts and Dukes of Maine
Main (disambiguation)
Maine Coon
Maine law, an 1851 temperance law
Maine Road, a British football stadium
Mains (disambiguation)
Mane (disambiguation)
Mayne (disambiguation)
River Maine (disambiguation)